The ventral posterior nucleus is the somato-sensory relay nucleus in thalamus of the brain.

Input and output
The ventral posterior nucleus receives neuronal input from the medial lemniscus, spinothalamic tracts, and trigeminothalamic tract. It projects to the somatosensory cortex and the ascending reticuloactivation system.

Subdivisions
The ventral posterior nucleus is divided into:
Ventral posterolateral nucleus, which receives sensory information from the body.
Ventral posteromedial nucleus, which receives sensory information from the head and face via the trigeminal nerve.
Ventral intermediate nucleus, implicated in oscillatory tremor generation in Parkinson's disease and essential tremor.

Function
Functions in touch, body position, pain, temperature, itch, taste, and arousal. Modulates tremor in certain pathology.

Additional images

References

Thalamus